Luis Rebolledo de Palafox y Melzi, 4th Marquess of Lazán, 9th Marquess of San Felices de Aragón (June 2, 1772, Zaragoza – December 28, 1843, Madrid) was an  Aragonese officer and general during the Spanish War of Independence. Alongside his brother José de Palafox, the Duke of Saragossa, Lazán was a national hero in 19th century Spain for his defence of Saragossa from the French Imperial armies in 1808 and 1809.

Lazán was born to Juan Felipe Rebolledo de Palafox and doña Paula Melzi d'Eril and educated at the St. Thomas Aquinas College of the Pious Schools of Zaragoza in Zaragoza. In 1809 he commanded an army in the campaign for Catalonia, winning a notable success at Castellón. Upon the restoration of Ferdinand VII to the Spanish Crown in 1814 (Treaty of Valençay), Lazán aligned himself with the reactionary party defending Ferdinand's absolute monarchy and opposing the liberal Constitution of 1812. From 1815 to 1820 Lazán served as Captain General of Aragon.

References

1772 births
1843 deaths
Spanish generals
People from Zaragoza
Spanish commanders of the Napoleonic Wars
Counter-revolutionaries

Spanish nobility